William Henry Jewell (February 26, 1840 - January 2, 1912) was the nineteenth Mayor of Orlando from 1907 to 1910. He served in the civil war in the ranks of the twenty-first Mississippi Infantry
to November 1862, when he assigned to staff duty at Charleston, S. C., until
March, 1864, after which he served with General Wade Hampton until the surrender. He married his wife Carrie in 1879 and moved to Florida in 1886 where he practiced law and served two terms in the state legislature, spent time as a city attorney, and served three terms as Mayor of Orlando. He died suddenly at the age of 71 in 1912.

References

Mayors of Orlando, Florida
1840 births
1912 deaths
19th-century American politicians